Carpenter House may refer to:

in Switzerland
The Zimmermannhaus (Carpenter House) in Brugg, Switzerland, a heritage site of national significance

in the United States (by state then city)
Capt. Nathan Carpenter House, Eutaw, Alabama, listed on the National Register of Historic Places (NRHP)
Sumner-Carpenter House, Eastford, Connecticut, NRHP-listed
Carpenter House (Norwich, Connecticut), NRHP-listed
Joseph Carpenter Silversmith Shop, Norwichtown, Connecticut, a house and shop listed on the NRHP
Carpenter-Lippincott House, Centreville, Delaware, NRHP-listed
Reid-Jones-Carpenter House, Augusta, Georgia, NRHP-listed
Willard Carpenter House, Evansville, Indiana, NRHP-listed
James Sansom Carpenter House, Des Moines, Iowa, NRHP-listed
Carpenter House (Clark Station, Kentucky), NRHP-listed
Carpenter-Smith House, Crestwood, Kentucky, NRHP-listed
Carpenter House (Richland Parish, Louisiana), a historic stagecoach inn
Ezra Carpenter House, Foxborough, Massachusetts, NRHP-listed
Christopher Carpenter House, Rehoboth, Massachusetts, NRHP-listed
Col. Thomas Carpenter III House, Rehoboth, Massachusetts, NRHP-listed
Carpenter House (Rehoboth, Massachusetts), NRHP-listed
Carpenter Homestead, Seekonk, Massachusetts, NRHP-listed
George Carpenter House, Uxbridge, Massachusetts, NRHP-listed
David Carpenter House, Blissfield, Michigan, NRHP-listed
Elbert L. Carpenter House, Minneapolis, Minnesota, NRHP-listed
Eugene J. Carpenter House, Minneapolis, Minnesota, NRHP-listed
Eddie Eugene and Harriet Cotton Carpenter Farmstead, Lowell, Nebraska, listed on the NRHP in Kearney County, Nebraska
Frank Pierce Carpenter House, Manchester, New Hampshire, NRHP-listed
John B. Carpenter House, Plattsburgh, New York, NRHP-listed
Theodore Carpenter House, Mount Kisco, New York
Carpenter House (Valhalla, New York)
Stallings-Carpenter House, Clayton, North Carolina, NRHP-listed
Andrew Carpenter House, Lucia, North Carolina, NRHP-listed
Wallace W. Carpenter House, Granville, Ohio, listed on the NRHP in Licking County, Ohio
Joseph Carpenter House, Stroud, Oklahoma, NRHP-listed
A. S. V. Carpenter and Helen Bundy House, Central Point, Oregon, listed on the NRHP in Jackson County Oregon
Samuel Carpenter's "Slate Roof House", Philadelphia, Pennsylvania
Carpenter House (Plano, Texas), a historic house in Collin County, Texas
Miles B. Carpenter House, Waverly, Virginia, NRHP-listed
Michael Carpenter House, Milwaukee, Wisconsin, listed on the NRHP in Wisconsin

Related names
 Carpenter's Rock House, a large rock shelter in Wayne County, Kentucky, named for Benjamin Carpenter, an American Revolutionary War soldier
 Carpenter's Coffee House (later known as "The Finish", "The Queen's Head" and "Jack's"), a coffee house in Covent Garden, London, England
 The House Carpenter's Daughter, a folk album by Natalie Merchant

See also
 Carpenter (surname)
 List of people with surname Carpenter